Limbikani Oscar Mzava (born 12 November 1993) is a Malawian professional footballer who last played as a centre back for South African club AmaZulu.

Club career
Born in Blantyre, Mzava joined Bloemfontein Celtic from Malawian side ESCOM United in 2011. He moved to Mpumalanga Black Aces for the 2015–16 season.

International career
He made his international debut for Malawi in 2009. At youth level he captained the national under-17 team at the 2009 African U-17 Championship. He was included in Malawi's squad for the 2021 Africa Cup of Nations.

References

1993 births
Living people
People from Blantyre
Malawian footballers
Malawi international footballers
Malawi youth international footballers
ESCOM United FC players
Bloemfontein Celtic F.C. players
Mpumalanga Black Aces F.C. players
Lamontville Golden Arrows F.C. players
Highlands Park F.C. players
AmaZulu F.C. players
South African Premier Division players
Association football fullbacks
Malawian expatriate footballers
Malawian expatriate sportspeople in South Africa
Expatriate soccer players in South Africa
2021 Africa Cup of Nations players